Broken Record Prayers is a compilation album by British indie pop band Comet Gain. It was released in the UK on 28 October 2008 through M.J. "Woodie" Taylor's own label, Milou Studios.

Track listing
All songs written by David Feck except where noted.

Notes
Tracks 1, 20: "Jack Nance Hair" 7" (Mei Mei)
Tracks 2, 14: "You Can't Hide Your Love Forever" 7" (Fortuna Pop!)
Tracks 3, 17, 18: Peel Session
Tracks 4, 5, 15: Mailorder Freak Singles Club 7" (Kill Rock Stars)
Tracks 6, 12: "Beautiful Despair" 12" (What's Your Rupture?)
Tracks 7, 10: "Love Without Lies" 7" (What's Your Rupture?)
Track 11: Fields and Streams CD
Tracks 16, 19: "Red Menace" 7" (PIAO)

References

External links
Milou Studios on Myspace

Comet Gain albums
2008 compilation albums